Gabriela Sabatini was the defending champion and won in the final 6–0, 6–2 against Isabel Cueto.

Seeds
A champion seed is indicated in bold text while text in italics indicates the round in which that seed was eliminated. The top eight seeds received a bye to the second round.

  Gabriela Sabatini (champion)
  Isabel Cueto (final)
  Bettina Fulco (semifinals)
  Patricia Tarabini (quarterfinals)
  Christiane Jolissaint (second round)
  Laura Garrone (quarterfinals)
  Mercedes Paz (quarterfinals)
  Barbara Paulus (semifinals)
  Vicki Nelson-Dunbar (third round)
  Adriana Villagrán (first round)
  Gisele Miró (quarterfinals)
  Pilar Vásquez (second round)
  Katrina Adams (first round)
  Lea Antonoplis (second round)
 n/a
 n/a

Draw

Finals

Top half

Section 1

Section 2

Bottom half

Section 3

Section 4

External links
 1987 WTA Argentine Open Draw

1987 Singles
Argentine Open - Singles
ATP